Euphemia and the Goth is a  romance text of Syriac literature set at Edessa in 396 AD but is dated to the fifth century AD. The text is known to have survived in two Syriac manuscripts (the earlier of the 9th century) and in a Greek translation.

Narrative overview 

The narrative pertains to a Gothic soldier in the Roman army stationed at Edessa to help repel the Huns, and upon being in the tombs of the Confessors Shmona, Gurya, and Habib, he promises a widow Sophia to marry and protect her only daughter Euphemia. After, the Goth takes Euphemia to his home only to have her enslaved to his Gothic wife. Euphemia's infant is then poisoned by the wife, but Euphemia revenges when she kills the wife by poisoning also; Euphemia is then shut in the tomb of the wife, but after praying to the Confessors, she is instantly transferred back to her mother Sophia in Edessa. The Goth sometime later returns to Edessa only to be confronted by Euphemia and Sophia. Both make an affidavit against him concerning Euphemia's affliction, and though the bishop of Edessa Eulogius intervened, the Stratelates of Edessa has the Goth beheaded. The actual bishop of Edessa in 396 was Cyrus, Eulogius having died in 387.

See also 
 Acts of Sharbel

Editions 
F. C. Burkitt, ed. Euphemia and the Goth, with the Acts of Martyrdom of the Confessors of Edessa. Williams and Norgate, 1913. Reprinted by Gorgias Press, 2007.

Citations

Bibliography 

Texts in Syriac
Syriac Christianity